United Concrete Pipe Corporation main construction was of main water pipeline lines, building concrete bridges, concrete roads, and foundations for buildings. United Concrete Pipe was established in 1919 in Ventura, California by (Thomas) Tom P. Polich. In 1924 Steve Krai and B. J. Ukropina became partners with Polich. Tom Polich was born on March 22, 1888 in Serbia and came to the US in 1905. Polich worked for a concrete company in Van Nuys, California before starting his own company. His first contact was installing a irrigation system in Tuttle, California. In the 1930s under the Works Progress Administration the company grew to nine plants and became a general contractor, not just a pipe company. Plants were in California, Texas and New Mexico. In 1953 the three started a new parallel joint venture Ukropina-Polich-Krai of San Gabriel, a general contractor company. United Concrete Pipe Corporation headquarters was at 85th St. and Vermont Ave., Los Angeles, California. One Works Progress Administration project was the Wawona Tunnel built in 1933.  In 1937 United Concrete Pipe completed a Works Progress Administration project the Mad River Water Supply Project in Eureka, California. United Concrete Pipe Corporation last plant closed in 1994, at Riverside, California.

In 1943, United Concrete Pipe established a shipyard division in Long Beach, California, to build small coasters ships for the US Army under the Emergency Shipbuilding Program. The shipyard of United Concrete Pipe was in Long Beach at breath 83, at the north side of channel 2, at the entrance to the channel. Unique to the boatyard was the assembly line railway the ships were built on. As the boat was built it would move down the rail track towards the water. The steel for the shipyard was shaped by the United Concrete Pipe Baldwin Park, California plant. The Army ships were 176-foot, a beam of 30 feet, a draft of 8 feet, and were 935 tons loaded. Power was from two General Motors Clevland diesel engine each with 500 hp. The first ship was complete on March 23, 1944.

Ships

See also
 California during World War II
Maritime history of California

Reference

American boat builders